Renée Lamberet (4 October 1901 – 12 March 1980) was a French anarchist historian.

Biography

Lamberet was born in Paris into a family of free thinkers. As a young professor of history and geography, she collaborated with the historian Max Nettlau, notably producing the work La Première Internationale en Espagne (1868–1888) (The First International in Spain).

During the Spanish Revolution of 1936, she fostered intense activity under the auspices of the Solidaridad Internacional Antifascista (SIA), helping to develop the "Spartaco" children's colony to host refugee children from Basque Country, Asturias and the front in Madrid.

During this period, she contributed to Spain and the World, published by London's Freedom Press
.

Organiser of the Anarchist Federation 

After the close of World War II, she helped in re-establishing the Anarchist Federation in France.

Bibliography

References

1901 births
1980 deaths
French anarchists
Historians of anarchism
20th-century French historians
Members of the French Anarchist Federation